Zogoré is a department or commune of Yatenga Province in northern Burkina Faso. Its capital lies at the town of Zogoré.

Towns and villages

References

Departments of Burkina Faso
Yatenga Province